Henry John Spanjer (January 9, 1873 – July 16, 1958) was an American lightweight and welterweight boxer who competed in the early twentieth century.

He was born in Grand Rapids, Michigan and died in St. Petersburg, Florida. The correct spelling of his name is "Spanjer" nevertheless many sources misspell his name as "Spanger".

In the lightweight category of the 1904 Summer Olympics he defeated fellow American Jack Egan in the final to win a gold medal but took silver in the heavier welterweight category.

He won two medals in Boxing at the 1904 Summer Olympics, one of only a four boxers to capture more than one medal in the same Olympics. George Finnegan, Charles Mayer, and Oliver Kirk, who also competed in St. Louis, were the others.

References

External links

1873 births
1958 deaths
Sportspeople from Grand Rapids, Michigan
Boxers from Michigan
Lightweight boxers
Welterweight boxers
Olympic boxers of the United States
Boxers at the 1904 Summer Olympics
Olympic gold medalists for the United States in boxing
Olympic silver medalists for the United States in boxing
American male boxers
Medalists at the 1904 Summer Olympics